Anderson dos Santos may refer to:

Lexe (born 1977), Brazilian footballer named Anderson dos Santos
Kanu (footballer, born 1985), Brazilian footballer named Anderson dos Santos
Anderson dos Santos (fighter) (born 1985), Brazilian mixed martial arts fighter
Anderson Jorge dos Santos (born 1972), Brazilian track and field sprinter